Robert Godfrey may refer to:

Robert J. Godfrey (born 1937), British clergyman
Robert John Godfrey (born 1947), musician
W. Robert Godfrey, American clergyman
Robert Godfrey (reverend) (1872–1948), Scottish born missionary, naturalist and Xhosa-lexicographer, who worked in South-Africa

See also 
Bob Godfrey (1921–2013), English animator